The Everett-Bradner House, also known as the Bradner-Young House, is located at 156 South Street in the village of Goshen, New York.  It has been a Registered Historic Place since 2004.

The listing included "the house, a brick smokehouse, a small frame barn, and a well and hand pump. The property also contains a larger barn complex that [was, in 2004] unfortunately in an advanced state of dereliction and is in the process of collapsing."

References

Houses completed in the 18th century
Houses on the National Register of Historic Places in New York (state)
Houses in Orange County, New York
National Register of Historic Places in Orange County, New York
Goshen, New York
Georgian architecture in New York (state)